Stade de l'Unité is a multi-use stadium in Goma, Democratic Republic of the Congo.  It is currently used mostly for football matches and serves as the home venue for AS Dauphins Noirs, DC Virunga and AS Kabasha.

The stadium was rehabilitated and reopened on May 6, 2018 with a match between AS Kabasha and DC Virunga.

References 

Football venues in the Democratic Republic of the Congo
Goma